ZPT may refer to:
 
Zero Point Technologies LLC
 Zope Page Templates
 Zinc pyrithione